Roxita fujianella is a moth in the family Crambidae. It was described by Sung and Chen in 2002. It is found in China (Fujian).

References

Crambinae
Moths described in 2002